Zee Variasi was a Hindi entertainment channel that starts its broadcast on 31 August 2006, originally through channel 74. The channel moved to channel 21 in late 2006, and channel 108 when the channel renumbering takes effect on 1 October 2007. The Zee Variasi name was used from 31 January 2011. The channel ended its broadcast 30 September 2016 and was replaced by TARA HD on the same channel number. Unlike Zee Variasi, Tara HD is a high-definition channel.
2016 disestablishments in Malaysia
Zee Entertainment Enterprises 
Television channels and stations established in 2006 
Television channels and stations disestablished in 2016